The Scottish War Emergency Cup was a temporary competition held at the start of the Second World War, due to the suspension of the Scottish Cup by the SFA. It was held between February and May in 1940, the competition involved all sixteen League clubs still operating at the time, Cowdenbeath later withdrew which meant Dunfermline Athletic received a bye in the first round. Rangers beat Dundee United 1–0 in the Final.

All match details are sourced to the Scottish Football Historical Archive.

First round
Dunfermline Athletic received a bye in the first round due to Cowdenbeath's withdrawal.

First legs

Second legs

Second round

Replays

Quarter-finals

Replay
The match was abandoned after 117 minutes due to poor light.

Second replay

Semi-finals

Replay

Final

Teams

References

War Emergency Cup
War Emergency Cup
War
Wartime football in Scotland